This is a list of the members of Stortinget, the Norwegian parliament, in the period 2001 to 2005. The members were elected in the Norwegian parliamentary election of 10 September 2001.

The parliament convened on 22 October 2001, and the term ended on 30 September 2005.

Voting system
Members to Stortinget are elected based on party-list proportional representation in plural member constituencies. This means that representatives from different political parties, are elected from each constituency. The constituencies are identical to the 19 counties of Norway.

The electorate does not vote for individuals but rather for party lists, with a ranked list of candidates nominated by the party. This means that the person on top of the list will get the seat unless the voter alters the ballot. Parties may nominate candidates from outside their own constituency, and even Norwegian citizens currently living abroad.

The Sainte-Laguë method is used for allocating parliamentary seats to parties. As a result, the percentage of representatives is roughly equal to the nationwide percentage of votes. Still, a party with a high number of votes in only one constituency can win a seat there even if the nationwide percentage is low. In this election, this happened with the Coastal Party. Conversely, if a party's initial representation in Stortinget is proportionally less than it share of votes, the party may seat more representatives through leveling seats, provided that the nationwide percentage is above the election threshold, currently at 4%. In 2001, eight seats were allocated via the leveling system.

Overview
A total of 165 representatives were elected, distributed as follows:
23 to the Socialist Left Party (Sosialistisk Venstreparti)
43 to the Labour Party (Arbeiderpartiet)
10 to the Centre Party (Senterpartiet)
1 to the Coastal Party (Kystpartiet)
22 to the Christian Democratic Party (Kristelig Folkeparti)
2 to the Liberal Party (Venstre)
38 to the Conservative Party (Høyre)
26 to the Progress Party (Fremskrittspartiet)

Before the end of the term, the Progress Party group had been reduced to 24 as two representatives left the party, continuing as independents.

If a representative is absent for whatever reason, his or her seat will be filled by a candidate from the same party-list – in other words, there are no by-elections. Representatives who die during the term are replaced permanently, whereas representatives who are appointed to a government position, such as government minister (cabinet member) or state secretary, will be replaced by a deputy representative until the representative no longer holds the government position. Deputy representatives also meet during typically short-term absence, like when a representative travels abroad with a parliamentary work group or is absent for health reasons.

In October 2005, when the term ended, the percentage of female representatives was approximately 37.5%.

List of representatives
The representatives elected as leveling seats are indicated with a blue background.

References

Note: This source also includes deputy representatives ("supleanter") who meet in the Parliament for brief and arbitraty periods of time, for instance when a regular representative travels abroad with a parliamentary work group, or is absent for health reasons. Due to the fluctuant nature of such replacements, they should not be included in this list.

Notes